The fifth cabinet of Ion I. C. Brătianu was the government of Romania from 29 November 1918 to 26 September 1919.

Ministers
The ministers of the cabinet were as follows:

President of the Council of Ministers:
Ion I. C. Brătianu (29 November 1918 - 26 September 1919)
Minister of the Interior: 
George G. Mârzescu (29 November 1918 - 26 September 1919)
Minister of Foreign Affairs: 
Ion I. C. Brătianu (29 November 1918 - 26 September 1919)
Minister of Finance:
Oscar Kiriacescu (29 November 1918 - 26 September 1919)
Minister of Justice:
Dumitru Buzdugan (29 November 1918 - 26 September 1919)
Minister of Religious Affairs and Public Instruction:
Ion Gh. Duca (29 November - 12 December 1918)
Constantin Angelescu (12 December 1918 - 26 September 1919)
Minister of War:
Gen. Artur Văitoianu (29 November 1918 - 26 September 1919)
Minister of Public Works:
Anghel Saligny (29 November 1918 - 14 February 1919)
(interim) Alexandru Constantinescu (14 February - 26 September 1919)
Minister of Industry and Commerce:
Alexandru Constantinescu (29 November 1918 - 26 September 1919)
Minister of Agriculture and Property:
Fotin Enescu (29 November - 3 December 1918)
(interim) Alexandru Constantinescu (3 - 12 December 1918)
Ion Gh. Duca (12 December 1918 - 26 September 1919)

Ministers without portfolio:
Mihail Pherekyde (29 November 1918 - 26 September 1919)

Ministers without portfolio (for Bessarabia):
Ion Inculeț (29 November 1918 - 26 September 1919)
Daniel Ciugureanu (29 November 1918 - 26 September 1919)

Ministers without portfolio (for Transylvania):
Vasile Goldiș (29 November 1918 - 26 September 1919)
Ștefan Cicio Pop (29 November 1918 - 26 September 1919)

Ministers without portfolio (for Bukovina):
Iancu Flondor (29 November 1918 - 15 April 1919)
Ion Nistor (29 November 1918 - 26 September 1919)

References

Cabinets of Romania
Cabinets established in 1918
Cabinets disestablished in 1919
1918 establishments in Romania
1919 disestablishments in Romania